WMR may refer to:

Media and music
"WMR", a track by El-P and Camu Tao from the 2004 compilation album Def Jux Presents 3 
 World Marxist Review, the English-language name of the 1958–1990 Communist journal Problems of Peace and Socialism
World Mission Radio, a 1980s evening religious radio program broadcast by an unlicensed operator from a ship in the North Sea

Railways
Wellington and Manawatu Railway Company, a private rail transport company in New Zealand that operated from 1881 to 1908
West Midlands Railway, part of West Midlands Trains, the current holder of the West Midlands franchise
Widney Manor railway station, a station served by the UK National Rail association
WMR No. 10, an 1891 2-6-2 tank locomotive

Software
Windows Mixed Reality, a mixed reality platform designed by Microsoft
WMR e-Pin, LLC, a software development firm from whom DataTreasury acquired four check-imaging technology patents in February 2006

Other
.22 Winchester Magnum Rimfire, also called .22 WMR, .22 Magnum, or .22 Mag, a rimfire rifle cartridge
Mananara Nord Airport, the International Air Transport Association (IATA) airport code for the airport in Mananara Nord, Toamasina Province, Madagascar
Western Mindanao Region (WMR), one of six regions of the Christian And Missionary Alliance Churches of the Philippines (CAMACOP)
WMR Biomedical, a company co-founded by American chemist George M. Whitesides